The Reformed Church of Highland Park is a Reformed Church in America church and congregation in Highland Park, New Jersey.

Congregation 
The congregation formed in 1890. Construction of the church began in 1897 and the building was dedicated on October 1, 1898. It had been eight years since the congregation was formed. They celebrated their 100th anniversary in 1990.

Building
The building was designed by Alexander Merchant (1872-1952), the architect responsible for numerous notable buildings in Highland Park, particularly in the Livingston Manor Historic District. It was his first design for Highland Park. The auditorium wing is circa 1920.

The buildings have been equipped with solar panels.

Housing
The RCHP Affordable Housing Corporation has built and maintains homes for the disenfranchised or homeless groups, among them veterans, chronically homeless adults, refugees, asylum seekers, youth leaving foster care, formerly-incarcerated students including projects in Highland Park, New Brunsick, and Newark.

Immigrant sanctuary
The church has provided sanctuary for undocumented immigrants since at least 2012. Notably, it gained national attention when church became a sanctuary for Indonesian immigrants facing deportation. Again in 2018, the church received attention when some of its parishioners, who had been targeted by U.S. Immigration and Customs Enforcement (ICE), took refuge in the church. They were visited by Phil Murphy, the New Jersey Governor and Gurbir Grewal, the New Jersey Attorney General who vowed to take up the matter.
Grewal later asked the United States Department of Homeland Security to clarify its policy with regard to policing 'sensitive areas' such as churches and schools. Two parishioners who had been arrested were prevented from being deported by a restraining order.

After four Christian Indonesian residents of the town had been deported in February 2017, the municipal council began considering an "immigrant inclusive" resolution, which was adopted in June 2017. It stated law enforcement would be based on New Jersey Department of Law and Public Safety guidelines and would not assist or interfere with federal immigration actions.

Pastors

See also
Sanctuary movement
Sanctuary city

External links

References 

Highland Park, New Jersey
Churches in Middlesex County, New Jersey
Reformed Church in America churches in New Jersey
1890 establishments in New Jersey